Teemu Laakso (born August 27, 1987) is a Finnish former professional ice hockey defenceman. He began and finished his career with HIFK of the Liiga.

Playing career
Laakso was drafted in the 3rd round (78th overall) by the Nashville Predators in the 2005 NHL Entry Draft. Laakso previously played for HIFK in Finland's SM-liiga. He has also played with Team Finland in two Under-18 world championships and three Under-20 world championships. Laakso was called up to Nashville during the 2011 Stanley Cup playoffs before their 2nd round series with the Vancouver Canucks.

On June 3, 2012, unable to establish himself in the NHL after four seasons within the Predators organization, Laakso left to sign a two-year contract with Russian team, Severstal Cherepovets.

Career statistics

Regular season and playoffs

International

Awards and honours

References

External links

Teemu Laakso Official fansite

1987 births
Living people
Finnish ice hockey defencemen
HIFK (ice hockey) players
Milwaukee Admirals players
Nashville Predators draft picks
Nashville Predators players
People from Tuusula
Severstal Cherepovets players
Växjö Lakers players
Sportspeople from Uusimaa